Melaleuca spectabilis is a plant in the myrtle family, Myrtaceae, and is endemic to the south-west of Western Australia. It was formerly known as a subspecies of Melaleuca longistaminea. It is a low, prickly shrub with yellow or lime-green flowers in spring and early summer.

Description

The flowers are yellow to lime-green and arranged in heads on the sides of the branches. The stamens are arranged in five bundles around the flowers and there are 9 to 24 stamens per bundle.

Taxonomy and naming
Melaleuca longistaminea subsp. spectabilis was first described in 1999 by Bryan Barlow and Lyndley Craven in Australian Systematic Botany. It was raised to species status in 2010 by Craven, Lepschi and Cowley in Nuytsia. The specific epithet (spectabilis) is a Latin word meaning "notable", "showy" or "remarkable" referring to the showy flowers

Distribution and habitat
This melaleuca occurs in the Geraldton and Ajana districts in the Geraldton Sandplains biogeographic region. The plants grow in scrub and low heath in sandy or gravelly clay loam.

Conservation
Melaleuca spectabilis is listed as "not threatened" by the Government of Western Australia Department of Parks and Wildlife.

References

spectabilis
Myrtales of Australia
Plants described in 1999
Endemic flora of Western Australia